Hybolasiopsis abnormalis is a species of beetle in the family Cerambycidae, and the only species in the genus Hybolasiopsis. It was described by Sharp in 1903.

References

Pogonocherini
Beetles described in 1903